Angie Birgit Geschke (born 24 May 1985) is a German handball player for VfL Oldenburg and the German national team.

References

1985 births
Living people
German female handball players
Sportspeople from Lübeck
Expatriate handball players
German expatriate sportspeople in Denmark
German expatriate sportspeople in Norway